This is a list of shipwrecks located in or around South America.

Argentina

Brazil

Chile

Ecuador

Falkland Islands

Galápagos Islands

Peru

Uruguay

Venezuela

References

Further reading

External links
  the wreck of the San José.  Royal Geographical Society of South Australia
 WRECKSITE Worldwide database of + 65,000 wrecks with history, maritime charts and GPS positions (subscription required)

South America
Shipwrecks